Kozyndan is the joint pseudonym of Los Angeles-based husband-and-wife illustrator team Kozue and Dan Kitchens, known in particular for their whimsical and occasionally absurd illustrations of modern cityscapes.

Education and background
The pair met while majoring in illustration at California State University, Fullerton. Since then, their projects have included CD covers for bands such as Weezer and The Postal Service, clothing (including lines of illustrated shoes), and posters for companies such as Nike, Inc.

Kozyndan care deeply about the topic of wildlife conservation.

Video game work
The team has created conceptual designs for American McGee's video game Bad Day L.A.. Other video game work includes the cover design for The Urbz: Sims in the City and artwork using characters from Katamari Damacy.

Australia
In the spring of 2011, Kozyndan toured Australia, with exhibitions in Perth, Melbourne, and Sydney.  A portion of the proceeds went to benefit the Japanese earthquake relief fund.

On-air
The pair has done radio shows at Dublab.

References

 "State of the Art." Giant Robot Magazine issue 63, 2009.

External links
 Blog of kozyndan
 Official kozyndan Website
 Kozyndan Video Interviews
 Kozyndan on Dublab
 Print interview with kozyndan 
 kozyndan x Puma

American illustrators
Art duos